Harmon Air Force Base is a former World War II United States Army Air Forces airfield, and postwar United States Air Force Base on Guam in the Mariana Islands. Originally named "Depot Field", it was renamed in honor of Lieutenant General Millard F. Harmon. Harmon Air Force Base was closed in 1949 due to budget constraints and was merged with the neighboring Naval Air Station Agana.

History
Harmon Field was built by CB 25 as the headquarters for the XXI Bomber Command and later Twentieth Air Force which directed the B-29 Superfortress strategic bombing campaign against the Japanese Home Islands. It was also the major B-29 aircraft depot and maintenance facility in the Western Pacific during the war, and that mission continued for Far East Air Forces until its closure.

Harmon was used operationally by the United States Air Force 11th Bombardment Group as an operational B-29 Base. After the war the 9th Bombardment Group used the base for strategic reconnaissance missions and the 374th Troop Carrier Group of the Technical Service Command used the base for transport of supplies and equipment from its depot facilities. Harmon Air Force Base was closed in 1949 due to budget constraints  and was merged with the neighboring Naval Air Station Agana.

Today, the technical facilities are an industrial area to the northeast of the Antonio B. Won Pat International Airport, which served as the main airfield for both Harmon Air Force Base and Naval Air Station Agana.

Major units assigned
1537th Army Air Forces Base Unit, 30 September 1944 – 1 August 1945
75th Air Service Group, 1 May 1947 – 20 September 1948
367th Air Service Group, 1 May 1947 – 1 November 1949
Guam Air Depot (later Guam Air Materiel Area, Marianas Air Materiel Area) 
 56th Air Depot Group, Air Technical Service Command,  9 November 1944 – 31 August 1945
 24th Air Depot Group, Air Technical Service Command,  8 November 1944 – 1 July 1949
 55th Air Depot Group, Air Technical Service Command,  1 January 1945 – 21 December 1945
 25th Air Depot Group, Air Technical Service Command, 21 January 1945 – 1 November 1949
XXI Bomber Command, 4 December 1944 – 16 July 1945
Twentieth Air Force, 16 July 1945 – 16 May 1949
Western Pacific Wing, Air Transport Command, 10 April 1946 – 1 March 1947
11th Bombardment Group (Very Heavy), 15 May 1946 – 20 October 1948
9th Bombardment Group  (Very Heavy), 9 June 1947 – 20 October 1948
374th Troop Carrier Group, 1 April 1947 – 5 March 1949
3d Reconnaissance Squadron (Very Long Range, Photographic), 11 January 1945 – 15 March 1947

See also

Andersen Air Force Base
USAAF in the Central Pacific

References
Maurer, Maurer (1983). Air Force Combat Units of World War II. "Maxwell Air Force Base, Alabama": Office of Air Force History. .

External links
www.pacificwrecks.com

Airfields of the United States Army Air Forces in the Pacific Ocean theatre of World War II
Airfields of the United States Army Air Forces Air Transport Command in the Pacific Ocean Theater
Military installations closed in 1949
1944 establishments in Guam